Sarigam is a town and an industrial notified area in Umbergaon Taluka of Valsad district in the Indian state of Gujarat.

Demographics
 India census, Sarigam INA had a population of 100,000. Males constitute 63% of the population and females 37%. Sarigam INA has an average literacy rate of 70%, higher than the national average of 59.5%: male literacy is 70%, and female literacy is 42%. In Sarigam INA, 18% of the population is under 6 years of age.

References

Cities and towns in Valsad district